The 2018 Copa CONMEBOL Libertadores Femenina was the tenth edition of the CONMEBOL Libertadores Femenina (also referred to as the Copa Libertadores Femenina), South America's premier women's club football tournament organized by CONMEBOL. The tournament was held in Manaus, Brazil from 18 November to 2 December 2018.

Originally planned from 4 to 18 November the tournament was pushed back two weeks because of the 2019 FIFA Women's World Cup qualification CONCACAF–CONMEBOL play-off which fell in the time frame.

Atlético Huila defeated Santos in the final on penalties to win their first tournament title. Iranduba defeated Colo-Colo to finish third.

Audax were the defending champions, having won the title the previous year as a joint team with Corinthians. They were eliminated in the group stage.

Host selection
There were eventually three bids for the 2018 Copa Libertadores Femenina: Manaus, Santa Cruz de la Sierra and São Paulo proposed by Iranduba, Deportivo ITA and Corinthians, respectively. On 11 June 2018, CONMEBOL announced that the tournament would be held in Manaus and Iranduba gained the host association additional berth.

Teams
The competition was contested by 12 teams: the champions of all ten CONMEBOL associations were given one entry, additionally the title holders re-entered and the host association qualified one more team.

Notes

Venues
Initially two stadiums (Estádio Ismael Benigno and Arena da Amazônia) would host the tournament. On 14 November 2018, CONMEBOL announced that the Estádio Ismael Benigno would no longer host matches, and matches originally to be played there would be moved to Arena da Amazônia. During the tournament, CONMEBOL decided to move the matches scheduled on 25 and 26 November at Estádio Roberto Simonsen to protect the football field of Arena da Amazônia.

Matches were played in Manaus. The stadiums were:
Arena da Amazônia (capacity: 44,300)
Estádio Roberto Simonsen (capacity: 4,000)

Draw
The draw for the tournament was held on 7 November 2018 (originally scheduled on 3 November), 19:00 AMT (UTC−4), at the Arena da Amazônia in Manaus. The 12 teams were drawn into three groups of four containing a team from each of the four pots. The defending champions Audax were automatically seeded into Pot 1 and allocated to position A1 in the group stage. For the remaining two teams from hosts Brazil, the first representative was seeded into Pot 2 and the second representative was seeded into Pot 4. The remaining teams were seeded based on the results of their association in the 2017 Copa Libertadores Femenina. Teams from the same association could not be drawn into the same group.

Group stage
In the group stage, the teams were ranked according to points (3 points for a win, 1 point for a draw, 0 points for a loss). If tied on points, tiebreakers would be applied in the following order (Regulations Article 20):
Goal difference;
Goals scored;
Head-to-head result in games between tied teams;
Number of red cards;
Number of yellow cards;
Drawing of lots.

The winners of each group and the best runners-up among all groups advanced to the semi-finals.

All times are local, AMT (UTC−4).

Group A

Group B

Group C

Ranking of group runners-up

Knockout stage
The semi-final matchups were:
Group A winner vs. Group C winner
Group B winner vs. Best runner-up
The semi-final winners and losers played in the final and third place match respectively. If tied after full time, extra time would not be played, and the penalty shoot-out would be used to determine the winner (Regulations Article 23).

Bracket

Semi-finals

Third place match

Final

Top goalscorers

References

External links
CONMEBOL Libertadores Femenina Brasil 2018, CONMEBOL
Libertadores Feminina, Confederação Brasileira de Futebol

2018
2018 in women's association football
2018 in South American football
2018 in Brazilian football
International club association football competitions hosted by Brazil
November 2018 sports events in South America
December 2018 sports events in South America